Hiromi Makihara's perfect game is a perfect game pitched by Hiromi Makihara of the Yomiuri Giants against the Hiroshima Toyo Carp on May 18, 1994, as the Giants defeated the Carp 6–0. It was the 15th perfect game in Nippon Professional Baseball (NPB) history and the second by a member of the Giants.

Statistics

Line score

Notes

References 

1994 Nippon Professional Baseball season
Nippon Professional Baseball perfect games
Yomiuri Giants
Hiroshima Toyo Carp
Sports competitions in Fukuoka
May 1994 sports events in Asia
History of Fukuoka Prefecture